In mathematics, a disjoint union (or discriminated union) of a family of sets  is a set  often denoted by  with an injection of each  into  such that the images of these injections form a partition of  (that is, each element of  belongs to exactly one of these images). A disjoint union of a family of pairwise disjoint sets is their union.

In category theory, the disjoint union is the coproduct of the category of sets, and thus defined up to a bijection.  In this context, the notation  is often used.

A standard way for building the disjoint union is to define  as the set of ordered pairs  such that  and the injection  as

Example

Consider the sets  and  It is possible to index the set elements according to set origin by forming the associated sets

The disjoint union  can then be calculated as follows:

Set theory definition

Formally, let  be a family of sets indexed by  The disjoint union of this family is the set
 
The elements of the disjoint union are ordered pairs  Here  serves as an auxiliary index that indicates which  the element  came from. 

Each of the sets  is canonically isomorphic to the set

Through this isomorphism, one may consider that  is canonically embedded in the disjoint union. 

Occasionally, the notation

is used for the disjoint union of a family of sets, or the notation  for the disjoint union of two sets. This notation is meant to be suggestive of the fact that the cardinality of the disjoint union is the sum of the cardinalities of the terms in the family. Compare this to the notation for the Cartesian product of a family of sets. 

In the language of category theory, the disjoint union is the coproduct in the category of sets. It therefore satisfies the associated universal property. This also means that the disjoint union is the categorical dual of the Cartesian product construction. See coproduct for more details.

For many purposes, the particular choice of auxiliary index is unimportant, and in a simplifying abuse of notation, the indexed family can be treated simply as a collection of sets.

Category theory point of view

In category theory the disjoint union is defined as a coproduct in the category of sets. 

As such, the disjoint union is defined up to an isomorphism, and the above definition is just one realization of the coproduct, among others. When the sets are pairwise disjoint, the usual union is another realization of the coproduct. This justifies the second definition in the lead.

See also

References 

 
 

Basic concepts in set theory
Operations on sets